The ischioanal fossa (formerly called ischiorectal fossa) is the fat-filled wedge-shaped space located lateral to the anal canal and inferior to the pelvic diaphragm. It is somewhat prismatic in shape, with its base directed to the surface of the perineum and its apex at the line of meeting of the obturator and anal fasciae.

Boundaries
It has the following boundaries:

Contents
The contents include:
 Inside Alcock's canal, on the lateral wall
 internal pudendal artery
 internal pudendal vein
 pudendal nerve
 Outside Alcock's canal, crossing the space transversely
 inferior rectal artery
 inferior rectal veins
 inferior anal nerves
 fatty tissue across which numerous fibrous bands extend from side to side allows distension of the anal canal during defecation

See also
 Anal triangle

References

Additional images

External links
 
  - "The Female Perineum: The Ischioanal Fossa"
 
 
 
 Diagram at Emory University

Perineum